Neotricula aperta is a species of freshwater snail, an aquatic gastropod mollusk in the family Pomatiopsidae.

This species serves as a sole intermediate host for the fluke Schistosoma mekongi, that causes Mekong schistosomiasis.

Distribution
Currently, Neotricula aperta is known from 31 localities in Cambodia, Laos and Thailand, involving nine river systems. The known range of Neotricula aperta is from just south of Kratié in the Mekong river of Cambodia to Kong Lor in Savannakhet of central Laos.

This species occurs:
Along the Mekong River in Cambodia and in the upper Xe Kong river valley in northeastern Cambodia
Laos
 In Northeast Thailand

The type locality is Ban Na on Khong Island, Laos.

Description 
A detailed account of the anatomy of Neotricula aperta was given by Davis et al. in 1976.

Three strains of Neotricula aperta have been recognized (called α, β and γ), on the basis of shell size and body pigmentation. Although all three strains are susceptible to Schistosoma mekongi (γ> > β > α), only the γ-strain is epidemiologically significant.

Ecology 
Neotricula aperta is exclusively epilithic or epixylic (on rotting wood). Neotricula aperta is found only in shallow areas (typically 0.5 to 3 m deep) of the Mekong river and some of its tributaries. The snails are restricted to areas where the current is moderate (around 2 × 103 m3s−1), the water is clear and the bed rock forms (almost flat) platforms where agal aufwuchs is extensive. Such conditions exist only during the dry season in the lower Mekong (March to May) and so Neotricula aperta populations persist mostly by recruitment (from eggs laid on stones in the previous year) or re-colonization from other rivers, and transmission of Schistosoma mekongi is seasonal. Population density can reach up to 4734 snails per m².

In addition, Neotricula aperta is not known from waters of low conductivity or pH and is calciphilic; the pH of all Neotricula aperta habitats sampled to date is > 7.5 and the river systems in which the snails are found have always been those draining karst areas. More recently, Neotricula aperta has been found in the primary streams emerging from karst springs, close to the origins of the streams. The snail Neotricula aperta requires hard water to provide the calcium needed  for rapid shell growth as populations re-establish in the Mekong river each year following the annual flood.

The ecological requirements of Neotricula aperta indicate that this snail will not become established in the reservoirs or downstream channels of dams in the region and that flooding of habitats by impoundment will eliminate all Neotricula aperta populations from the affected area.

Neotricula aperta grazes the algal epilithon and therefore, unlike species such as Biomphalaria (African vector of other kind of schistosomiasis), cannot survive in areas where sediment is depositing and preventing the growth of the algae upon which it feeds. Indeed, ecological studies of Neotricula aperta have shown that this snail is found only on stones covered with fine sediments and that this species is highly sensitive to silting.

References
This article incorporates CC-BY-2.0 text from the reference

Further reading
Attwood S. W. (1994). "Rates of recruitment among populations of the freshwater snail Neotricula aperta (Temcharoen) in North East Thailand". Journal of Molluscan Studies 60(2): 197-200. .
Attwood S. W. (1995). "The effect of substratum grade on the distribution of the freshwater snail y-Neotricula aperta (Temcharoen), with notes on the sizes of particles ingested". Journal of Molluscan Studies 61(1): 133-138. .
Attwood S. W., Upatham E. S. & Southgate V. R. (2001). "The detection of Schistosoma mekongi infections in a natural population of Neotricula aperta at Khong Island, Laos, and the control of Mekong schistosomiasis". Journal of Molluscan Studies 67(3): 400-405. .

External links

Pomatiopsidae
Gastropods described in 1971